Kid Abelha was a pop band from Rio de Janeiro, Brazil, formed by Paula Toller (lead vocals), George Israel (sax, guitar and vocals) and Bruno Fortunato (acoustic and electric guitar). The group has recorded 13 studio albums, 3 live albums and 2 live DVDs. They have created many songs which have entered into Brazilian pop-rock history. The group sold more than 8 million albums worldwide.

History
A precursor group was formed by drummer Carlos Beni, Pedro Farah and Leoni, called "Chrisma". In 1981, Paula Toller meets Leoni in college, PUC-Rio, they start dating and then she used to visit the band rehearsals. The boys always asked her to join the band, but she denied a lot of times, saying she was too shy, but her constant visits to the rehearsals motivated her to sing. George Israel, otherwise, was seen playing saxophone in Búzios and invited by a friend of Leoni to meet the band. In 1982, with guitarist Beto Martins and American keyboardist Richard Owens they recorded a demo tape "Fixação" ("Fixation") and "Vida de cão é chato pra cachorro" ("Living like a dog is boring like hell"). Drummer Beni took the tape to radio station Fluminense FM; when asked the band's name, he took a piece of paper from his pocket that had the list of names considered by the group without reaching a consensus and read out the first one: Kid Abelha & os Abóboras Selvagens ("Kid Bee and the Wild Pumpkins"). Achieving success in the Rio underground scene, the two songs were released on the compilation album Rock Voador, with other new Brazilian rock bands. The band then recorded the single "Pintura Íntima"/"Por que não eu?", with more than 100,000 copies sold.

In 1984 the band released their first album, "Seu Espião" ("Your Spy"), which included, among others, the classic "Pintura Íntima" ("Private Painting"), "Fixação" ("Fixation") and "Como Eu Quero" ("How I Want"). With this LP, they received the first gold record of the new generation of Brazilian artists.

In 1985, the band performed at the first Rock in Rio, an experience described by the band as their "entrance exam" into the business.

In 1986 Leoni had an altercation with Léo Jaime that also involved Paula Toller, Leoni's wife Fabiana Kherlakian and Herbert Vianna. After being hit by Paula with a pandeiro, Leoni left the band.

Discography

Studio albums
 Seu Espião (Your Spy) (1984) 
 Educação Sentimental (Sentimental Education) (1985)
 Tomate (Tomato) (1987)
 Kid (1989)
 Tudo é Permitido (1991) (Anything Goes)
 Iê Iê Iê (1993) (Yeah, Yeah, Yeah)
 Meu Mundo Gira Em Torno de Você (1996) (My World Revolves Around You)
 Autolove (1998)
 Espanhol (1999) (Spanish)
 Coleção (2000) (Collection)
 Surf (2001)
 Pega Vida (2005) (Catch Life)

Live albums
 Kid Abelha Ao Vivo (1986)
 Meio Desligado (1995)
 Kid Abelha Acústico MTV (2002)
 Multishow Ao Vivo: Kid Abelha 30 anos (2012)

Compilations
 Greatest Hits 80's (1990)
 Geração Pop (1993)
 Remix (1997)
 E-Collection (2001)
 Warner 30 Anos (2006)

EPs / Singles
 "Pintura Íntima"/"Por Que Não Eu?" (1983)
 "Como Eu Quero"/"Homem Com Uma Missão" (1984)
 Kid Abelha Single (1997)

Singles

Filmography

Music videos
 Como Eu Quero (1984)
 Seu Espião (1984)
 Nada Tanto Assim (1984)
 Lágrimas e Chuva (1985)
 Os Outros (1985)
 Nada Por Mim (1986)
 Tomate (1987)
 Me Deixa Falar (1987)
 Agora Sei  (1989)
 Grand Hotel (1991)
 No Seu Lugar (1991)
 Eu Tive Um Sonho (1993)
 Em Noventa e Dois (1993)
 Te Amo Pra Sempre (1996)
 Na Rua, Na Chuva, Na Fazenda (1996)
 ¿Porque Me Quedo Tán Sola? (1997)
 Eu Só Penso em Você (1998)
 Maio... (1998)
 Deve Ser Amor (2000)
 Eu Contra A Noite (2001)
 O Rei do Salão (2001)
 Eu Não Esqueço Nada (2001)
 Nada Sei (2002)
 Quero te Encontrar (2002)
 Poligamia (2005)
 Peito Aberto (2005)
 Pq Eu Não Desisto de Vc (2005)
 Eu Tou Tentando  (2005)

DVDs
 Acústico MTV (2002)
 Pega Vida (2005)

References

External links
Official website
[ Kid Abelha at All Music]
History of Brazilian rock in the 1980s 

Brazilian pop music groups
Musical groups established in 1981
Warner Music Group artists
Universal Music Group artists
Musical groups from Rio de Janeiro (city)
1981 establishments in Brazil